The AC 58 (Anti-Char, 58 mm) is an anti-armour rifle grenade used by the French Army. Its official French Army designation is Grenade à fusil antichar de 58 mm Mle F1 PAB.

Design
The AC 58 comprises a body with a shaped charge warhead and a tail fitted with stabilizing fins. Detonation is initiated by a nose impact and a base fuse. Luchaire designed it at the end of the 1970s to replace the existing STRIM 65 rifle grenade design dating from 1961 that had become obsolete.

The AC 58 uses a bullet trap that allows the use of ball cartridges, rather than the older method that required a blank cartridge to propel the grenade.

Use
To launch, the AC58 is placed over the muzzle of a FAMAS or any NATO rifle with a STANAG muzzle device. Then the rifle is pointed at the target and fired. The impact of the bullet striking the bullet-trap and the expanding gases launches and arms the grenade, which explodes on impact.

The AC58 is used in direct fire. Under an optimal angle, the AC 58 is capable of piercing 350 mm of armour. FAMAS provides a built in an alidade-type device for aiming to 75 to 100 metres.

The Luchaire Wasp 58 individual antiarmour-assault weapon also uses the AC58's warhead.

See also
APAV40

Sources and references

 TTA 150, p. 109

External sources
Article (in Spanish) with reference to several French rifle grenades

Grenades of France
Rifle grenades
Anti-tank grenades